The following list is of the completed works by the Toronto architectural firm John B. Parkin Associates.

Parkin